Enforcement is the process of ensuring compliance with laws, regulations, rules, standards, or social norms.

Enforcement may also refer to:

 Law enforcement, a system organized to enforce the law 
 Enforcement of foreign judgments, the recognition of judgments rendered in another jurisdiction
 Enforcement discretion, the power to choose whether or how to punish a person who has violated the law
 Enforcement (film), a 2020 Danish film also known as Shorta

See also
 Enforcer (disambiguation)